Kalidindi is a village in Eluru district of the Indian state of Andhra Pradesh.
Kalidindi is famous for aqua agriculture with latest techniques. It's been a fort city and an adjacent village Kota Kalidindi suggests the same.   

Raja Raja narendra once made Kalidindi as a temporary capital for his kingdom. There are famous temples in Kalidindi which have great history.

Geography 
Kalidindi is Located 83 km from Vijayawada, 38 km from Gudivada, 27 km from Bhimavaram (West Godavari district) and 12 km from Kaikaluru.

References 

Villages in Eluru district
Mandal headquarters in Eluru district